Benakanahalli is a village in Chitradurga district of Karnataka, India.

Demographics
As of the 2011 Census of India there were 223 households in Benakanahalli and a total population of 1,237 consisting of 627 males and 610 females. There were 102 children ages 0-6.

References

Villages in Dharwad district